Brissaud is a French surname. Notable people with the surname include:

Édouard Brissaud (1852–1909), French physician and pathologist
Brissaud's reflex, a medical sign
Geoffrey Brissaud (born 1998), French ice dancer
Laurent Brissaud (born 1965), French slalom canoeist
Manuel Brissaud, French slalom canoeist
Pierre Brissaud (1885–1964), French artist

French-language surnames